Ivanna Daniela Olivares Miranda (born 11 July 1991) is a Chilean teacher who was elected as a member of the Chilean Constitutional Convention.

References

External links
 BCN Profile

Living people
1991 births

Chilean people
21st-century Chilean politicians
University of Valparaíso alumni
Members of the List of the People
Members of the Chilean Constitutional Convention
21st-century Chilean women politicians